Kevin W. Techau (born December 6, 1958) is an American attorney who served as the United States Attorney for the Northern District of Iowa from 2014 to 2017.

Early life and education
Teachau served in the United States Air Force for seven years including two deployments to Germany as a  judge advocate. Upon leaving active duty, he joined the Iowa Air National Guard and served with the 185th Fighter Wing in Sioux City, 132nd Fighter Wing in Des Moines and the Iowa Air National Guard Joint Forces Headquarters at Camp Dodge. He retired as a colonel with 27 years of military service and he received the Legion of Merit.

See also
2017 dismissal of U.S. attorneys

References

1958 births
Living people
United States Attorneys for the Northern District of Iowa
Iowa Democrats
Public defenders
University of Iowa College of Law alumni
National Guard (United States) colonels
Iowa National Guard personnel
Recipients of the Legion of Merit
United States Air Force Judge Advocate General's Corps